The BYU Cougars football statistical leaders are individual statistical leaders of the BYU Cougars football program in various categories, including passing, rushing, receiving, total offense, all-purpose yardage, defensive stats, and kicking. Within those areas, the lists identify single-game, single-season, and career leaders. The Cougars represent Brigham Young University as an independent in NCAA Division I FBS through the 2022 season, after which BYU will join the Big 12 Conference.

Although BYU began competing in intercollegiate football in 1922, these lists are dominated by more recent players for several reasons:
 Since 1922, seasons have increased from 6 games to 11 and then 12 games in length.
 The NCAA didn't allow freshmen to play varsity football until 1972 (with the exception of the World War II years), allowing players to have four-year careers.
 Bowl games only began counting toward single-season and career statistics in 2002. The Cougars have played in 16 bowl games since then, allowing many recent players an extra game to accumulate statistics.
 Similarly, the Cougars have played games at Hawaii 16 times since 1978. When a team plays at Hawaii, they are allowed to schedule another game beyond the usual limit.
 Due to COVID-19 issues, the NCAA ruled that the 2020 season would not count against the athletic eligibility of any football player, giving everyone who played in that season the opportunity for five years of eligibility instead of the normal four.

These lists are updated to the end of the 2021 season.

Passing

Passing yards

Passing touchdowns

Rushing

Rushing yards

Rushing touchdowns

Receiving

Receptions

Receiving yards

Receiving touchdowns

Total offense
Total offense is the sum of passing and rushing statistics. It does not include receiving or returns.

Total offense yards

Touchdowns responsible for
"Touchdowns responsible for" is the official NCAA term for combined passing and rushing touchdowns.

All-purpose yardage
All-purpose yardage is the sum of all yards credited to a player who is in possession of the ball. It includes rushing, receiving, and returns, but does not include passing.

BYU does not list a complete top 10 in all-purpose yardage over any time frame (career, season, game), only listing the top 5 for each. It also does not break down its leaders' performances by type of play.

Defense

Interceptions

Tackles

Sacks

Kicking

Field goals made

Field goal percentage

References

BYU